Tylopilus neofelleus is a bolete fungus found in Taiwan, Sichuan and Yunnan provinces of China, Japan, and New Guinea. It is similar in appearance to Tylopilus felleus, but is distinguishable from that species by its smaller spores.

References

External links

neofelleus
Fungi described in 1967
Fungi of Australia